The 1970 NCAA Men's Water Polo Championship was the second annual NCAA Men's Water Polo Championship to determine the national champion of NCAA men's college water polo. Tournament matches were played at the Belmont Plaza Pool in Long Beach, California during December 1970.

UC Irvine defeated UCLA in the final, 7–6 (in three overtimes), to win their first championship. UCLA was the defending national champion.

For the second consecutive year, the leading scorer for the tournament was Ben Gage from UC Santa Barbara (17 goals). The awards for All-Tournament Team and Most Outstanding Player were not given out until 1972.

Qualification
Since there has only ever been one single national championship for water polo, all NCAA men's water polo programs (whether from Division I, Division II, or Division III) were eligible. A total of 8 teams were invited to contest this championship.

Bracket
Site: Belmont Plaza Pool, Long Beach, California

See also 
 NCAA Men's Water Polo Championship

References

NCAA Men's Water Polo Championship
NCAA Men's Water Polo Championship
1970 in sports in California
December 1970 sports events in the United States
1970